Francesco Massaro (born 1935) is an Italian director and screenwriter.

Born in Padua, Massaro started his career as assistant director of Luchino Visconti's The Leopard, then, during the sixties, continued to collaborate with eminent directors such as Pietro Germi, Dino Risi and Lucio Fulci. He debuted as director in 1972, with the commedia all'italiana Il generale dorme in piedi, then directed a number of comedy films and TV-series of good success.

Filmography 
 Il generale dorme in piedi (1972)
 La banca di Monate (1976) 
 Il lupo e l'agnello (1980)
 I carabbinieri (1981)
 Miracoloni (1981)
 Al bar dello sport (1983)
 Domani mi sposo (1984)
 Private Affairs (1987)

References

External links 
 

1935 births
Film people from Padua
Italian film directors
Italian screenwriters
Italian male screenwriters
Living people